Loanhead Primary School may refer to:

Loanhead Primary School in Kilmarnock, East Ayrshire, Scotland; on List of listed buildings in Kilmarnock, East Ayrshire
Loanhead Primary School in Loanhead, Midlothian, Scotland